The 2017 Americas Rugby League Championship was the second tri-nation rugby league competition between the national teams of the USA, Canada and Jamaica. The United States would defend its title with a clean sweep of the tournament just like in 2016.

Results

(*Also played as part of 2017 Colonial Cup*)

References

Rugby League America's Cup
2017 in Jamaican rugby league
2017 in Canadian rugby league
2017 in American rugby league
Americas Rugby League Championship